The 1986 World Junior Ice Hockey Championships (1986 WJHC) was the tenth edition of the Ice Hockey World Junior Championship and was held from December 26, 1985, until January 4, 1986.  It was held mainly in Hamilton, Ontario, Canada.  The Soviet Union won the gold medal, its seventh championship, Canada won silver and the United States won bronze.  The bronze medal was the first for the Americans in tournament history.

Final standings
The 1986 tournament was a round-robin format, with the top three teams winning gold, silver and bronze medals respectively.

West Germany was relegated to Pool B for 1987.

Results

Scoring leaders

Tournament awards

Pool B
Eight teams contested the second tier this year in Klagenfurt Austria from March 13 to 22.  It was played in a simple round robin format, each team playing seven games.

Standings

Poland was promoted to Pool A and Bulgaria was relegated to Pool C for 1987.

Pool C
This tournament was played in Gap, France, from March 21 to 27.  China made its debut in the junior tournament.

Standings

France was promoted to Pool B for 1987.

References

 
1986 World Junior Hockey Championships at TSN
 Results at Passionhockey.com

World Junior Ice Hockey Championships
World Junior Ice Hockey Championships
International ice hockey competitions hosted by Canada
Sports competitions in London, Ontario
World Junior Ice Hockey Championships
World Junior Ice Hockey Championships
World Junior Ice Hockey Championships
World Junior Ice Hockey Championships
World Junior Ice Hockey Championships
Ice hockey competitions in Hamilton, Ontario
20th century in Hamilton, Ontario
Sport in Orillia
Sport in Newmarket, Ontario
Sport in Kitchener, Ontario
Sport in Oshawa
Oakville, Ontario
International sports competitions in Toronto
Sport in Brantford
Sports competitions in Klagenfurt
1985–86 in Austrian ice hockey
1985–86 in French ice hockey
International ice hockey competitions hosted by Austria
International ice hockey competitions hosted by France
Ice hockey competitions in Toronto